was a town located in Haibara District, Shizuoka Prefecture, Japan.

Kamikawane and Higashikawane were two of a series of villages established in Haibara District on October 1, 1889. Kamikawane and Higashikawane Villages were merged to create Honkawane Town on September 30, 1956.

As of September 1, 2005, the town had an estimated population of 3,025 and a density of 8.06 persons per km2. The total area was 375.35 km2. The area is noted for its production of green tea.

On September 20, 2005, Honkawane, along with the town of Nakakawane (also from Haibara District), was merged to create the town of Kawanehon.

Dissolved municipalities of Shizuoka Prefecture
Kawanehon, Shizuoka